This is a list of comedy films released in the 1990s.

1990

1991

1992

1993

1994

1995

1996

1997

1998

1999

British
Bean (1997)
Beautiful People (1999)
Brassed Off (1996)
Bring Me the Head of Mavis Davis (1997)
The Commitments (1991)
East is East (1999)
The Englishman Who Went Up a Hill But Came Down a Mountain (1995)
Four Weddings and a Funeral (1994)
The Full Monty (1997)
Funny Bones (1995)
Gregory's Two Girls (1999)
Guest House Paradiso (1999)
Hear My Song (1991)
Hour of the Pig (1993)
An Ideal Husband (1999)
Jack and Sarah (1995)
Keep the Aspidistra Flying (1997)
Leon the Pig Farmer (1992)
A Life Less Ordinary (1997)
Little Voice (1998)
Lock, Stock and Two Smoking Barrels (1998)
Mad Cows (1999)
The Madness of King George (1995)
Much Ado About Nothing (1993)
Notting Hill (1999)
Peter's Friends (1992)
Plunkett and MacLeane (1999)
Princess Caraboo (1994)
Rebecca's Daughters (1992)
Shakespeare in Love (1998)
Shooting Fish (1997)
Sliding Doors (1998)
Still Crazy (1998)
Truly, Madly, Deeply (1991)
Waking Ned (1998)
The Wrong Trousers (1993)

Comedy-horror
 
1990
Tremors

1991
Bride of Killer Nerd
Cabinet of Dr. Ramirez
Killer Nerd
Nudist Colony of the Dead
The People Under the Stairs

1992
Army of Darkness
Buffy the Vampire Slayer
Braindead (aka Dead Alive)
Death Becomes Her

1993
Leprechaun
Love Bites
My Boyfriend's Back
Return of the Living Dead 3

1994
Cemetery Man
Funny Man

1995
Blood and Donuts
The Day of the Beast
Dracula: Dead and Loving It
Tremors 2: Aftershocks
Vampire in Brooklyn

1996
Camping Cosmos
Cannibal! The Musical
The Frighteners
Frostbiter: Wrath of the Wendigo
From Dusk Till Dawn

1997
Dance with the Devil
Evil Ed
Jack Frost
Killer Condom
Uncle Sam

1998
Bride of Chucky
Legion of Fire: Killer Ants!

1999
Idle Hands

Hong Kong
The Tricky Master (1999)

Japanese
Maroko (1990)

Filipino
John en Marsha 91 (1991)

Parody
Austin Powers: International Man of Mystery (1997)
Austin Powers: The Spy Who Shagged Me (1999)
Don't Be a Menace to South Central While Drinking Your Juice in the Hood (1996)
Dracula: Dead and Loving It (1995)
Fatal Instinct (1993)
Galaxy Quest (1999)
Hot Shots! (1991)
Hot Shots! Part Deux (1993)
Jane Austen's Mafia! (1998)
Loaded Weapon 1 (1993)
Mars Attacks! (1996)
Robin Hood: Men in Tights (1993)
Spy Hard (1996)
Wrongfully Accused (1998)

Comedy-drama
Air Bud (1997)
Forrest Gump (1994)
Friday (1995)
Fried Green Tomatoes (1991)
Homeward Bound (1993)
I Hired a Contract Killer (1993)
A Man of No Importance
Matilda (1996)
Mrs. Doubtfire (1993)
Muriel's Wedding (1994)
Reality Bites (1994)
The Sandlot (1993)
The Truman Show (1998)
What's Eating Gilbert Grape (1993)
White Men Can't Jump (1992)

References

Bibliography

 

1990s

Comedy